John Newcombe and Tony Roche were the defending champions, but lost in the first round to Cliff Drysdale and Nikola Pilić.

Roy Emerson and Rod Laver defeated Arthur Ashe and Dennis Ralston in the final, 4–6, 9–7, 6–8, 6–4, 6–4 to win the gentlemen's doubles title at the 1971 Wimbledon Championships.

Seeds

  John Newcombe /  Tony Roche (first round)
  Ken Rosewall /  Fred Stolle (quarterfinals)
  Bob Hewitt /  Frew McMillan (first round)
  Ilie Năstase /  Ion Țiriac (quarterfinals)

Draw

Finals

Top half

Section 1

Section 2

Bottom half

Section 3

Section 4

References

External links

1971 Wimbledon Championships – Men's draws and results at the International Tennis Federation

Men's Doubles
Wimbledon Championship by year – Men's doubles